ADG or Adg may refer to:

Adg, a village in Iran

Symbols and initialisms
ADG, Asociación Deportiva Guanacasteca, Costa Rican soccer team
ADG, the United States Navy hull classification symbol for "degaussing ship"
Abstract differential geometry
Active Data Guard
Acyclic Directed Graph
Advanced Data Guarding
Aerospace, Defense & Government
Air-driven generator
Airfield Defence Guards
Alpha Delta Gamma, a national fraternity
Amlan Das Gupta
Andegerebinha dialect, an Aboriginal language of Australia (ISO 639-3 code)
Art Directors Guild
Aubrey de Grey
Australian Directors' Guild
Autonomous Design Group, an anti-capitalist artist collective
Lenawee County Airport (IATA: ADG)